Exeter Township is a civil township of Monroe County in the U.S. state of Michigan. The population was 3,968 at the 2010 census.

Communities
East Exeter is a former settlement within the township that briefly had its own post office from March 14, 1850 until October 2, 1851.
Exeter contained its own post office from July 6, 1840 to June 28, 1842 and again from March 14, 1850 to September 14, 1903.
Maybee has its own post office with the 48159 ZIP Code, which serves the village and portions of Exeter Township, as well as portions of several nearby townships.

Geography

Demographics
As of the census of 2000, there were 3,727 people, 1,262 households, and 1,004 families residing in the township. The racial makeup of the township was 91.82% White, 6.14% African American, 0.30% Native American, 0.38% Asian, 0.03% Pacific Islander, 0.40% from other races, and 0.94% from two or more races. Hispanic or Latino of any race were 0.94% of the population.

There were 1,262 households, out of which 37.1% had children under the age of 18 living with them, 68.8% were married couples living together, 6.7% had a female householder with no husband present, and 20.4% were non-families. 16.2% of all households were made up of individuals, and 5.6% had someone living alone who was 65 years of age or older.  The average household size was 2.95 and the average family size was 3.33.

In the township the population was spread out, with 27.7% under the age of 18, 8.1% from 18 to 24, 31.1% from 25 to 44, 23.5% from 45 to 64, and 9.6% who were 65 years of age or older.  The median age was 36 years. For every 100 females, there were 104.7 males.  For every 100 females age 18 and over, there were 105.8 males.

The median income for a household in the township was $63,806, and the median income for a family was $69,429. Males had a median income of $50,718 versus $26,818 for females. The per capita income for the township was $24,308.  About 2.7% of families and 4.8% of the population were below the poverty line, including 8.1% of those under age 18 and 5.0% of those age 65 or over.

Education
Exeter Township is served by four school districts.  The majority of the township is served by Airport Community Schools.  The southeastern portion of the township is served by Monroe Public Schools, which also includes the majority of the village of Maybee.  The southwestern corner of the township, including a small western portion of the village of Maybee, is served by Dundee Community Schools.  The northwestern portion of the township is served by Milan Area Schools.

Notable people
 Lewis Welch (1814–1878), Michigan state senator

Images

References

Sources

Townships in Monroe County, Michigan
Townships in Michigan
Populated places established in 1836
1836 establishments in Michigan Territory